Marcelo Bonan (born 27 May 1981) is a Brazilian footballer who plays for São Bernardo FC.

Biography 
Bonan left for Campeonato Brasileiro Série C side Nacional (AM) in July 2005. He was the first choice keeper ahead Ângelo. However, he was on the bench in the quarter-finals matches.

In 2006 season, he left for  Rio Branco (SP), then for Santo André at Campeonato Brasileiro Série B. He was the first choice goalkeeper ahead Júnior Costa.

Bonan played the first match of Coritiba at 2007 Copa do Brasil. He then lost his starting place to Café. On the same day that Artur re-signed with Coritiba, he left for América (RN). He was the backup keeper behind Renê, Sérvulo and Gléguer Zorzin at 2007 Campeonato Brasileiro Série A.

In 2008, he left for Rio Preto to play at 2008 Campeonato Paulista. He was the backup keeper of Adriano Pitarelli until round 7.

In May he left for Campeonato Brasileiro Série B side Ceará. He was the backup keeper for Adilson and won the opening season of 2009 Campeonato Cearense with team. In 2009 Campeonato Brasileiro Série B he won promotion to Série A with club.

In 2010, he left for Campeonato Paulista Série A2 side São Bernardo FC. He was the first choice keeper ahead Anderson. He played 18 out of 19 group stage matches, but lost the starting place to Anderson in playoffs, only played the first 2 matches out of 6 matches.

After without a club for a few months, he was signed by Ituano in November 2010. In April 2011 he was signed by Fortaleza, city rival of Ceará.

Honours
Runner-up
Campeonato Potiguar: 2007
Campeonato Cearense: 2009
Winner of Taça Estado do Ceará: 2009

Career statistics

References

External links
 Futpedia Profile 
 CBF 
 

Brazilian footballers
Democrata Futebol Clube players
Nacional Futebol Clube players
Rio Branco Esporte Clube players
Esporte Clube Santo André players
Coritiba Foot Ball Club players
América Futebol Clube (RN) players
Ceará Sporting Club players
Ituano FC players
Association football goalkeepers
Sportspeople from Paraná (state)
1981 births
Living people